Antoine McClain (born December 6, 1989) is a former American football offensive guard. He initially signed with the Baltimore Ravens as an undrafted free agent in 2012. Originally from Anniston, Alabama, McClain played college football at Clemson University. He currently coaches offensive line for the Phoenix Phantoms of the Arizona Gridiron Football League.

High school
Antoine McClain played his high school career at Anniston High School in Anniston, Alabama. He was named to the ASWA First-team All-State after his senior season. He participated in the ESPN/Under Armour All-American game.

College career
He played college football at Clemson. During his time in Clemson, he participated in 2,438 snaps and he played in 54 games and started 41 of them.

In his freshman year, he played in 13 games and was involved in 149 snaps.

In his sophomore year, he started 14 games. He was named the starting offensive guard and recorded 66 knockdown blocks.

In his junior year, he played in 13 games and started all 13 games and he was involved in 704 snaps. He was selected to the Third-team All-ACC and ACC All-Academic Honor Roll.

In his senior year, he played in 14 games and started all 14 games.

Professional career

2012 NFL Combine

Baltimore Ravens
On April 30, 2012, after going undrafted in the 2012 NFL Draft, he signed with the Baltimore Ravens. On August 31, 2012, he was released. On September 1, 2012, he re-signed with the team and was assigned to the practice squad. He was released by the Ravens on August 31, 2013.

Oakland Raiders
On September 1, 2013, the Oakland Raiders signed McClain. He was released by the Raiders on October 5, 2013.

Buffalo Bills
On October 7, 2013, McClain was claimed off waivers by the Buffalo Bills. He was released by the Bills on August 30, 2014.

New Orleans Saints
McClain was signed to the practice squad of the New Orleans Saints on September 1, 2014. He was released by the Saints on September 24, 2014.

Chicago Bears
McClain was signed to the practice squad of the Chicago Bears on November 12, 2014.

Arizona Cardinals
On December 31, 2014, McClain was signed by the Arizona Cardinals. On September 5, 2015, he was released by the Cardinals. On September 7, 2015, McClain was brought back to the team and was placed on the practice squad. On January 26, 2016, McClain signed a futures contract with the Arizona Cardinals. On September 3, 2016, he was released by the Cardinals.

Baltimore Brigade
On May 17, 2017, McClain was assigned to the Baltimore Brigade.

References

External links

 Arizona Cardinals bio
 Oakland Raiders bio
 Baltimore Ravens bio
 Clemson Tigers bio

1989 births
Living people
Sportspeople from Anniston, Alabama
Players of American football from Alabama
American football offensive guards
Clemson Tigers football players
Baltimore Ravens players
Oakland Raiders players
Buffalo Bills players
Arizona Cardinals players
Baltimore Brigade players